Monkey King: Hero Is Back is a 2015 Chinese computer-animated film directed by first time director Tian Xiaopeng. The film was released on 10 July 2015. The film was the highest-grossing animated film in China until it was surpassed by the 2016 films Zootopia and Kung Fu Panda 3.

Plot
The all-powerful Monkey King, Sun Wukong, is imprisoned by the Buddha within an ice cage deep within the mountains for rebelling against heaven.

And 500 years later, Mountain Trolls attack a group of travellers- all except for a baby boy named Liuer are killed, and Liuer is adopted by a monk. Several years later, the same trolls invade a small village and kidnap 49 young children. Liuer saves one of the baby girls and is chased by the trolls for doing so. He stumbles into the cave where the Monkey King was imprisoned, and unknowingly releases him from his curse. Sun Wukong defeats the trolls, although he is only able to use physical attacks, since a remnant of Buddha's seal prevents him from regaining his magical powers, causing him pain whenever he tries to harness his magic.

Wukong attempts to break the Buddha's seal, to no avail. Liuer and the girl enthusiastically greet Wukong, not knowing he has lost his powers. Annoyed, Wukong attempts to lose the two, but is unable to evade them. A stone monster, created by the Buddha to keep Wukong imprisoned, attacks the three. Liuer manages to undo the spell on the monster, but falls off a cliff in the process. When he awakes, he finds out Wukong has saved him.

The three come upon Pigsy, a war god that Wukong defeated in a battle 500 years ago, now reincarnated into a pig demon. Though Wukong is again hesitant, Pigsy joins the group as well. They stay overnight at an inn, but its owners turn out to be Trolls in disguise, who try to kidnap the baby. More trolls arrive and Wukong fights them off. The leader of the monsters, Hun Dun, appears, defeating Wukong and capturing the girl. After Wukong refuses to pursue them, Liuer goes ahead to save them on his own.

At Hun Dun's lair, it is shown that he plans to sacrifice all the children they have kidnapped in order to gain magical powers. Liuer meets with his mentor, Fa Ming, to try to rescue them but nearly get captured. Wukong finds a doll of himself that Liuer had, and realises how important of a figure he is. He and Pigsy go to help Liuer. Saving Liuer and the 49 children, Wukong, defeats the monsters- however, a Solar Eclipse occurs, and Hun Dun turns into a titanic monstrous beast. Liuer is killed when the monster's rampage causes rocks to fall and crush him.

Upon seeing the boy's death, Sun Wukong is devastated. Full of fury, he forcibly breaks Buddha's Seal with sheer brute force, regaining his original supernatural powers, and easily defeats Hun Dun.

As the story ends, it is revealed Liuer survived the rocks- they return the abducted children to their families.

Cast

Crowdfunding
7.8 million yuan ($1.23 million) of the film's marketing costs was raised through crowdfunding, in exchange for listing of 109 producers (many of whom are children) in the film's credits.

Reception

Box Office
The film grossed $17.99 million CNY ($2.85 million USD) on its opening day, placing third at the Chinese box office. With positive reviews and word of mouth, the film's box office reception steadily increased, peaking at $65.87 million CNY ($10.44 million USD) a day, and first at the box office. The film began to drop due to competition from Monster Hunt and finished its run with a gross of $957 million CNY ($153 million USD). The film became the seventh highest grossing film in China of 2015 and the highest grossing animated film in China until being surpassed by Zootopia and Kung Fu Panda 3 the following year.

Reception
The film received generally positive reviews on Chinese review aggregators Maoyan and Douban with scores of 9.3 and 8.4 out of 10 ratings respectively.

Other media
On October 17, 2019, a video game was released on PlayStation 4, developed by Hexa Drive and published by Oasis Games.
As Sun Wukong (renamed Dasheng in the English dub), players guide Liuer and Pigsy (Zhu Bajie) to fight off Mountain Trolls and other monsters to save the kidnapped children from the clutches of the demon king Hun Dun, use statues of Guanyin to unlock spells to enhance skills and use various weapons to battle enemies. Two DLCs were available: Mind Palace, which is set within Sun Wukong's mind sealed inside the Buddha's crystal, where he trains himself in a series of obstacles and traps between different biomes, and Uproar in Heaven, which is set before the main story where the monkey king duels against three of the Jade Emperor's greatest warriors, Nezha, Juling Shen and the Jade Emperor's nephew Erlang Shen.

Awards and nominations

See also
 Deep Sea

References

External links
 

2010s Mandarin-language films
Chinese animated films
2015 computer-animated films
2015 animated films
2015 films
Films based on Journey to the West
Chinese computer-animated films
2015 directorial debut films